Alberton railway station may refer to:

Aldgate railway station, Adelaide, an Adelaide Metro railway station in South Australia
Aldgate tube station, a London Underground station
Aldgate East tube station, a London Underground station